Mór Gerő (13 June 1904 – 6 March 1979) was a Hungarian sprinter. He competed in the men's 400 metres at the 1928 Summer Olympics. During the 1920s, he was also a three-time national champion.

References

External links
 

1904 births
1979 deaths
Athletes (track and field) at the 1928 Summer Olympics
Hungarian male sprinters
Olympic athletes of Hungary
Place of birth missing